The 2009 European Mixed Team Badminton Championships were held at the Echo Arena in Liverpool, England, from 10-15 February, and were organised by the Badminton Europe and the Badminton England. It was the 20th edition of the tournament. Denmark was the defending champion. This is the first edition of European Mixed Team Badminton Championships which is not held together with the individual European Championships. The event also saw two bronze medals awarded for both losing semifinalist.

Denmark defeated England in the final 3–2 to defend their title.

Medalists

Group stage

Group 1

Group 2

Group 3

Group 4

Group 5

Group 6

Group 7

Group 8

Knockout stage

Quarterfinals

Semifinals

Final

External links
Tournament Software

References

European Mixed Team Badminton Championships
European Mixed Team Badminton Championships
Badminton
Badminton tournaments in England